The Gozo Football League is a football competition for clubs on the Maltese island of Gozo, in the Mediterranean Sea.  

The league is run by the Gozo Football Association and currently has 14 teams split into two divisions, the First Division (8 teams) and the Second Division (6 teams), thus making it two levels in the process. The BOV GFL First Division is the highest level of the Gozo Football League while the BOV GFL Second Division is the lowest level. At the end of the season, the winners of the Second Division are promoted into the First Division, whilst the bottom club of the First Division is relegated. A promotion/relegation playoff game takes place between the 7th placed First Division team and the team placing second in the Second Division and the winner will participate in the First Division and the loser will participate in the Second Division.

League system

Stadiums
Only two football stadiums are used for games in Gozo. Generally the 4000 capacity Gozo Stadium is used for First Division games, while most commonly Kercem Arkafort Stadium is used for Second Division games. Although this is the general standard, both divisions have used each stadium to some extent.

External links
Gozo Football Association Website
Gozo Football Association streaming and highlights

  
Football leagues in Malta
Football competitions in Gozo